Maximus of Turin (c. 380 – c. 423) is the first known Christian bishop of Turin. He was a theological writer who "made a great contribution to the spread and consolidation of Christianity in Northern Italy".

Life
Maximus is believed to have been a native of Rhaetia (modern-day Northern Italy). He was a disciple of Ambrose of Milan and Eusebius of Vercelli. Gennadius of Massilia described Maximus as a profound student of scripture and a learned preacher. Maximus mentions in a sermon that in 397 he witnessed, at Anaunia in the Rhaetian Alps, the martyrdom of Sisinnius, Martyrius, and Alexander, three missionary bishops, whom Ambrose had sent to assist Vigilius at Trento.

In 398 he was bishop of Turin, then a suffragan see of Milan. During his tenure, Turin was threatened with barbarian incursions; the city was filled with soldiers and refugees seeking safety behind its walls. He chided the landowners, who had fine houses in the city and estates in the country, for hiding their wealth away rather than using it relieve the suffering of those in need. He reprimanded those who would seek to profit from the unrest, and invited them instead to use their resources to redeem prisoners of war. Given the particular historical circumstances at that time, Bishop Maximus saw his role as guardian of the city. He "...governed his flock wisely and successfully in the troublous times of the Barbarian inroads into Italy".

In 451 he was at the synod of Milan where the bishops of Northern Italy accepted the celebrated letter (epistola dogmatica) of Pope Leo I, setting forth the orthodox doctrine of the Incarnation. Among nineteen subscribers Maximus is the eighth, and since the order was determined by age, Maximus must then have been about seventy years old. In 465, he was at the Synod of Rome. Here the subscription of Maximus follows immediately after the pope's, showing he was the oldest of the forty-eight bishops present. His successor was St. Victor.

Veneration

Feast day
His name is in the Roman Martyrology on 25 June:"In Turin, Saint Maximus, the first bishop of this See, who with his fatherly word called crowds of pagans to the faith of Christ and guided them with heavenly doctrine to the prize of salvation."

Patronage
The city of Turin honors him as its patron saint.

Iconography
A life which, however, is entirely unreliable, was written after the 11th century, and is printed in the Acta Sanctorum, June, VII, 3rd ed., 44–46. It states that a cleric one day followed Maximus with an evil intention to a retired chapel where he often prayed. The cleric suddenly became so thirsty that he implored Maximus for help. A roe deer happened to pass which the saint caused to stop, so that the cleric could partake of its milk. This legend accounts for the fact that Maximus is represented in art as pointing at a roe deer.

Works

There are about ninety of his sermons extant. His writings illustrate the customs and living conditions of the Lombard population at the time of the Gothic invasions; one homily contains the description of the destruction of Milan by Attila. Sermons 17 and 18 are addressed to the well-to-do reminding them that it is a Christian's responsibility to meet civil obligations, particularly in difficult times. With the lack of an effective civil administration, Maximus stated that it was a duty to pay taxes, regardless of how much one might prefer not to.(Sermon 26).

Other homilies are on the seasons of the ecclesiastical year and the feasts of Our Lord; 64–82. On the feast days of saints, his subject was the saint being commemorated that day. Several lessons from his homilies were inserted in the Roman Breviary. 

Maximus authored numerous discourses, first edited by Bruno Bruni, and published in 1784. These consist of one hundred and eighteen homilies, one hundred and sixteen sermons, and six treatises (tractatus). Many writings, however, which Bruni ascribes to Maximus are of doubtful origin. A new edition was published in the collection Corpus Christianorum Series Latina by Almut Mutzenbecher (n° XXIII, Turnhout 1962) which has accurately identified the corpus to be attributed to Maximus I of Turin. This is currently the best edition of Maximus' sermons (see this edition for more information on content and datation of each sermon).   

Three of the treatises are on baptism (but, now to be attributed to an anonym author of northern Italy, see Anonimo Veronese, Omelie mistagogiche e catechetiche, edizione critica e studio a cura di Giuseppe Sobrero, Rome, 1992), one against the Pagans, and one against the Jews. The last two are extant only in fragments, and their genuineness is doubtful. The sixth treatise, whose genuineness is also doubtful, contains short discourses on twenty-three topics taken from the Four Gospels. An appendix contains writings of uncertain authorship: thirty-one sermons, three homilies, and two long epistles addressed to a sick friend.  The discourses are usually very brief, and couched in forcible, though at times over flowery language. Among the many facts of liturgy and history touched on in the discourses are: abstinence during Lent (hom. 44), no fasting or kneeling at prayers during paschal time (hom. 61), fasting on the Vigil of Pentecost (hom. 62), the synod of Milan in 389 at which Jovinianus was condemned (hom. 9), the impending barbarian invasion (hom. 86–92), the destruction of the Church of Milan by the barbarians (hom. 94), various pagan superstitions still prevalent at his time (hom. 16, 100–02), and the supremacy of St. Peter (hom. 54, 70, 72, serm. 114).

Translations
Sermons of St. Maximus of Turin, translated and annotated by Boniface Ramsey, OP, 1989 (Ancient Christian Writers, 50)

References

External links

Icon of St. Maximus of Turin

Italian saints
Bishops of Turin
5th-century Italian bishops
465 deaths
5th-century Christian saints
Year of birth unknown
Year of birth uncertain
5th-century Latin writers
Clergy from Turin